Customs Street is a street in the Auckland City Centre, New Zealand, located between Hobson Street and Beach Road. The street is split into two sections at the junction of Queen Street, Customs Street West and Customs Street East.

History

Customs Street was built on reclaimed land. Customs Street East began as a seawall between Point Stanley and Point Britomart across Commercial Bay, a former bay that used to exist on the Auckland waterfront. By 1859, reclamation work on Commercial Bay had begun, and Customs Street was created. Much of the fill used to create the land along Customs Street was taken from Point Britomart, a former peninsula to the east of the street.

The street was an important centre for trade in Auckland in the early 20th century due to its proximity to the Auckland waterfront and the railway station. Customs Street had a mix of warehouses, commercial offices of shipping companies found on the north, with shops and businesses found to the south.

Demographics

Quay Street-Customs Street had a population of 2,274 at the 2018 New Zealand census, an increase of 18 people (0.8%) since the 2013 census, and an increase of 1,170 people (106.0%) since the 2006 census. There were 1,107 households, comprising 1,206 males and 1,065 females, giving a sex ratio of 1.13 males per female. The median age was 31.9 years (compared with 37.4 years nationally), with 180 people (7.9%) aged under 15 years, 795 (35.0%) aged 15 to 29, 1,152 (50.7%) aged 30 to 64, and 141 (6.2%) aged 65 or older.

Ethnicities were 39.2% European/Pākehā, 4.4% Māori, 3.4% Pacific peoples, 50.0% Asian, and 7.5% other ethnicities. People may identify with more than one ethnicity.

The percentage of people born overseas was 69.1, compared with 27.1% nationally.

Although some people chose not to answer the census's question about religious affiliation, 46.2% had no religion, 26.1% were Christian, 0.1% had Māori religious beliefs, 9.2% were Hindu, 6.5% were Muslim, 4.0% were Buddhist and 3.4% had other religions.

Of those at least 15 years old, 924 (44.1%) people had a bachelor's or higher degree, and 93 (4.4%) people had no formal qualifications. The median income was $37,500, compared with $31,800 nationally. 510 people (24.4%) earned over $70,000 compared to 17.2% nationally. The employment status of those at least 15 was that 1,185 (56.6%) people were employed full-time, 288 (13.8%) were part-time, and 87 (4.2%) were unemployed.

Notable locations
The Aon Centre, also known as the AMP Tower
Australis House
Commercial Bay, a mixed-use office tower and retail development 
The former Customhouse, now the location of duty-free shopping centre T Galleria
The Dilworth Building, a historic mixed-use building constructed in the 1920s.
Seascape, a residential skyscraper currently under construction
Queens Arcade, a historic shopping arcade
The United States Consulate General

Gallery

References

Auckland CBD
Streets in Auckland